Sapho is a 1934 French drama film directed by Léonce Perret and starring Mary Marquet, Jean-Max and Marcelle Praince.

The film's sets were designed by the art director Jacques Colombier.

Cast
 Mary Marquet as Fanny Legrand 
 Jean-Max as Dechelette 
 Marcelle Praince as Rosa 
 François Rozet as Jean Gaussin 
 Camille Bert as Caoudal 
 Madame Ahnar as Pilar 
 Nadia Sibirskaïa as La fille 
 Marguerite Ducouret as Madame Hettema 
 Jacqueline Made as Alice Doré 
 Marfa d'Hervilly as Clara 
 Charlotte Clasis as Divonne 
 Yvonne Mirval as Wilkie Cab 
 Germaine Montero as Madame Sombreuse 
 Lucien Brulé as De Potter 
 Jean Bara as Le petit Joseph 
 Fernand Charpin as Césaire 
 Georges Morton as Le père Legrand 
 Marcel Carpentier as Monsieur Hettema 
 André Perchicot as Paulus 
 Ky Duyen as Le domestique

See also
Inspiration (1931)

References

Bibliography 
 Goble, Alan. The Complete Index to Literary Sources in Film. Walter de Gruyter, 1999.

External links 
 

1934 films
French drama films
1934 drama films
1930s French-language films
Films directed by Léonce Perret
Pathé films
French black-and-white films
Films based on works by Alphonse Daudet
1930s French films